Shaun McKeown (born 2 March 1980) is a Paralympic track and road cyclist for Great Britain. Shaun won silver in the men's individual pursuit at the London 2012 Paralympic Games.

References 

Living people
1980 births
Paralympic cyclists of Great Britain
Paralympic silver medalists for Great Britain
Place of birth missing (living people)
Medalists at the 2012 Summer Paralympics
Cyclists at the 2012 Summer Paralympics
Paralympic medalists in cycling